Temkin is a surname of the following people
Ann Temkin, American art curator
Binyamin Temkin (born 1945), Israeli politician 
Deborah Temkin (born 1985), American child development scientist
Larry Temkin, American philosopher 
Owsei Temkin (1902–2002), Russian-born American medical historian
Moshik Temkin, historian
Richard J. Temkin (born 1945), American plasma physicist
Todd Temkin (born 1964), American poet